Peter Dylan Thomas (born 22 August 1964) is a former English cricketer.  Thomas was a right-handed batsman who bowled right-arm off break.  He was born in Willesden, Middlesex.

Thomas made his debut for Bedfordshire in the 1990 Minor Counties Championship against Cambridgeshire.  He played Minor counties cricket for Bedfordshire from 1990 to 1995, which included 15 Minor Counties Championship matches and 6 MCCA Knockout Trophy matches.  He made his List A debut against Worcestershire in the 1991 NatWest Trophy.  In this match, he scored 4 runs before being dismissed by Richard Illingworth.  He played a further List A match against Warwickshire in the 1994 NatWest Trophy.  In this match, he scored 4 runs before being dismissed by Roger Twose.  With the ball, he took the wicket of Dominic Ostler, for the cost of 71 runs from 12 overs.

References

External links

1964 births
Living people
People from Willesden
English cricketers
Bedfordshire cricketers